Kōzōsu (孝蔵主) was a Japanese noble lady, aristocrat and retainer of the Toyotomi clan. She was the daughter of Kawazoe Katsuhige, a retainer of the Gamō clan. She was an elite female officer under Nene's command and chief secretary to Toyotomi Hideyoshi. 

During the Toyotomi administration she possessed such authority that it was said that while Asano Nagamasa may run matters outside, Kōzōsu ran matters inside. She accompanied the Toyotomi clan in Japan's unification campaigns.

Life 
It is unknown when she started serving Nene (Kodai-in), but it seems that she was put in charge when Hideyoshi became Kampaku. She had tremendous power in Osaka Castle, and had a great political voice, such as sending a letter to Date Masamune on behalf of Hideyoshi when he conquered Odawara in 1590. 

When Hideyoshi died in 1598, she left Osaka Castle with Nene and lived in Kyoto. In 1606 with the help of Tokugawa Ieyasu, Nene established a Buddhist temple Kōdai-ji in Kyoto, and assumed the dharma name of Kōdai-in.

On the other hand, she has a deep connection with Tokugawa clan, and suddenly left Nene and moved to Edo just before the outbreak of the Siege of Osaka in 1614. There are various theories as to the reason for taking such actions, and the true intention of Kozosu is a mystery. Kozosu, who moved to Edo, served Tokugawa Hidetada and later was given 200 Koku to Kawachi Province in 1625. She died a year after becoming a Castelan in Kawachi Province.

References 

People of Sengoku-period Japan
Women of medieval Japan
16th-century Japanese people
Japanese women in warfare
Women in 16th-century warfare
16th-century Japanese women
17th-century Japanese women
Women in 17th-century warfare